The Primetime Emmy Award for Program of the Year was an annual award presented as part of the Primetime Emmy Awards. It recognized the best single television program of the year. In early Emmy ceremonies, anthology series were more common than traditional sitcoms or dramas; this made Program of the Year the highest honor.

Though traditional comedy and drama series were nominated, the majority of nominees and winners were: telefilms, variety specials, and documentaries. The award was last presented in 1973.

Winners and nominations

1950s

1960s

1970s

Total awards by network
 NBC – 8
 CBS – 5
 ABC – 3
 PBS – 1

Programs with multiple awards
5 awards
 Hallmark Hall of Fame (2 consecutive; 3 consecutive)

2 awards
 Playhouse 90 (consecutive)

Programs with multiple nominations
12 nominations
 Hallmark Hall of Fame (NBC)

5 nominations
 CBS Playhouse (CBS)
 Playhouse 90 (CBS)

2 nominations
 ABC Stage 67 (ABC)
 The Defenders (CBS)
 Disneyland (ABC)
 NET Playhouse (NET)
 Producers' Showcase (NBC)

Notes

References

External links
 Emmys.com – list of Nominees & Winners

Program of the Year
Primetime Emmy Awards
Awards established in 1955